Evergestis junctalis is a moth in the family Crambidae. It was described by Warren in 1892. It is found in Japan and on the Kuriles.

The wingspan is 10–19 mm.

Subspecies
Evergestis junctalis junctalis
Evergestis junctalis conjunctalis Inoue, 1955

References

Evergestis
Moths described in 1892
Moths of Asia